Epirrhoe hastulata is a moth of the family Geometridae.

Subspecies
Epirrhoe hastulata hastulata
Epirrhoe hastulata reducta (Djakonov, 1929)

Distribution
This species is known from Europe, from the area between northern Scandinavia and the Alps, through the Caucasus and central Asia to the Kamchatka Peninsula and the Kuril Islands.

Description
The wingspan is about 19–22 mm. Background of the wings is dark gray, with white markings and a narrow white transverse bands on the forewings. The fringes along the wing edge alternate black and white. Body is black with small white rings between the various segments.

Biology
Adults are on wing from May to June. The larvae feed on Galium species, including Galium verum. Larvae can be found from July to August. It overwinters as a pupa.

References

Epirrhoe
Moths of Japan
Moths of Europe
Taxa named by Jacob Hübner